Scardinius acarnanicus is a species of ray-finned fish in the family Cyprinidae.
It is found only in Greece, in the basin of the Acheloos River   and in adjacent lakes (e.g. Amvrakia, Trichonis). Its natural habitats are intermittent rivers and freshwater lakes.
It is threatened by habitat loss.

References

Scardinius
Fish described in 1991
Taxonomy articles created by Polbot